The Moluccan megapode (Eulipoa wallacei), also known as Wallace's scrubfowl, Moluccan scrubfowl or painted megapode, is a small, approximately 31 cm long, olive-brown megapode. The genus Eulipoa is monotypic, but the Moluccan megapode is sometimes placed in Megapodius instead. Both sexes are similar with an olive-brown plumage, bluish-grey below, white undertail coverts, brown iris, bare pink facial skin, bluish-yellow bill and dark olive legs. There are light grey stripes on reddish-maroon feathers on its back. The young has brownish plumage, a black bill, legs and hazel iris.

An Indonesian endemic, the Moluccan megapode is confined to hill and mountain forests on the Maluku Islands of Halmahera, Buru, Seram, Ambon, Ternate, Haruku and Bacan. It is also found on Misool Island in West Papua province.

The Moluccan megapode is the only megapode known to lay its eggs nocturnally. The nesting grounds are usually located in sun-exposed beach or volcanic soils.

Due to ongoing habitat loss, limited range and overhunting in some areas, the Moluccan megapode is evaluated as Vulnerable on the IUCN Red List of Threatened Species.

References

External links
BirdLife Species Factsheet

Moluccan megapode
Birds of the Maluku Islands
Moluccan megapode
Moluccan megapode